Kai Huisman (born 27 March 1995) is a Dutch professional footballer who plays as a forward for Door Ons Vrienden Opgericht.

Club career

FC Emmen
Huisman joined Eerste Divisie side FC Emmen after his contract with Vitesse expired. Huisman also had spells with amateur sides VV Blauw Geel '55 and KSV Fortissimo prior to his nine-year spell with Vitesse. Whilst with Vitesse, he also represented Netherlands at under-17 level in 2011. On 19 August 2016, Huisman went on to make his professional debut in a 1–0 away defeat against Jong PSV, in which he replaced Frank Olijve with thirteen minutes remaining.

Heracles Almelo
On 14 September 2017, Huisman joined Eredivisie side Heracles Almelo on a one-year deal.

Career statistics

References

External links
 
 

1995 births
Living people
People from Ede, Netherlands
Footballers from Gelderland
Dutch footballers
Association football forwards
Eerste Divisie players
Eredivisie players
Derde Divisie players
SBV Vitesse players
FC Emmen players
Heracles Almelo players
Netherlands youth international footballers